France Gareau (born April 15, 1967) is a Canadian athlete, who competed in the sprint events. Gareau was born in Verner, Ontario.

Gareau competed for Canada in the 1984 Summer Olympics held in Los Angeles, United States in the 100 metres and the 4 x 100 metres relay, where she anchored Canada to the silver medal (as a 17-year-old) with her teammates Angela Bailey, Marita Payne and Angella Taylor-Issajenko. Gareau also won relay medals at the 1990 Commonwealth Games, 1993 Summer Universiade and at two Francophone Games.

Gareau was also Canadian champion at the 100 metres in 1989.

Personal life
She is married to former Ottawa Rough Riders and BC Lions player Sean Foudy. Their sons Liam and Jean-Luc are ice hockey players. Liam was selected in the first round of the 2018 NHL Entry Draft by the Columbus Blue Jackets. Jean-Luc was selected in the third round of the 2020 NHL Entry Draft by the Colorado Avalanche.

References

Canadian female sprinters
Olympic silver medalists for Canada
Athletes (track and field) at the 1984 Summer Olympics
Olympic track and field athletes of Canada
Athletes (track and field) at the 1990 Commonwealth Games
Athletes (track and field) at the 1994 Commonwealth Games
Commonwealth Games bronze medallists for Canada
Franco-Ontarian people
Track and field athletes from Ontario
York University alumni
1967 births
Living people
People from West Nipissing
Commonwealth Games medallists in athletics
Medalists at the 1984 Summer Olympics
Olympic silver medalists in athletics (track and field)
Universiade medalists in athletics (track and field)
Universiade bronze medalists for Canada
Medalists at the 1993 Summer Universiade
Olympic female sprinters
20th-century Canadian women
Medallists at the 1990 Commonwealth Games